Fumee Lake is a lake in Dickinson County, Michigan, in the United States.

Fumee Lake was named by a French explorer after Fumay, in France.

See also
List of lakes in Michigan

References

Lakes of Michigan
Bodies of water of Dickinson County, Michigan